Panorama Mall is a mall in Panorama City, San Fernando Valley, Los Angeles, California. It is an enclosed mall anchored by two large discount stores, Walmart and Curacao, aimed primarily at a Hispanic customer base.

The mall originally opened as the open-air Broadway–Valley shopping center in 1955. Similar to what happened with nearby Valley Plaza, after opening additional department stores and retail strips opened on the periphery of the Broadway center. During the 1960s the merchants' association of the various owners marketed its retail properties collectively as the Panorama City Shopping Center. In 1964 it claimed to be the first center with four major department stores. Panorama Mall was renovated and enclosed in 1980.

History
Silverwoods, Mandel's, Kinney Shoes, Lerner's and Woolworth were the other stores in the complex.

The anchor department stores opened as follows:
The Broadway, opened October 10, 1955, 3 stories, currently Walmart
Montgomery Ward, opened September 13, 1961, 2 stories, closed in 2001, building currently empty
J. W. Robinson's, opened on June 27, 1961
Ohrbach's, opened October 7, 1964, 2 stories, 7.5-acre site, cost $5 million to build, currently the Valley Indoor Swap Meet.
A 1964 advertisement promoted 86 stores collectively as the "Panorama City Shopping Center" – not just the Broadway and Silverwoods complex. These included three full-line freestanding department stores within one block of The Broadway.

By the 1970s, business had declined compared to other regional malls that had opened in the Valley, such as the Sherman Oaks Galleria, Sherman Oaks Fashion Square, and Northridge Fashion Center.

In 1979, the Santa Monica-based Macerich Co. real estate development firm and the Connecticut General Mortgage and Realty Investments Co. bought the mall for $5.8 million, enclosed and renovated it. The $7 million in improvements included a refresh to the look of the mall, new construction including a second strip of shops, plus a roof over the mall walkway. A large stainless sculpture by artist Sebastian Trovato was added, portraying intertwining rings.

In 1986, the Panorama Mall ranked 40th out of the 61 regional shopping malls in Los Angeles and Orange Counties with more than $68 million in annual sales. Business was improving, according to the manager of the Broadway, but the Los Angeles Times characterized retail in the area as "awaiting revival". 

In the late 1990s, Walmart opened in the building vacated by the Broadway after that chain's merger into Federated Department Stores and then Macy's.

The owners renovated the mall again for $1 million in 2005.

As of 2019, the former Montgomery Ward store across from the mall is slated to become a residential and retail mixed-use development.

References

Shopping malls in the San Fernando Valley
Panorama City, Los Angeles
Welton Becket buildings